The 2013 Sevens Grand Prix Series was the 12th year of the annual rugby Sevens Grand Prix Series (formerly known as the European Sevens Championship) for rugby sevens organised by the FIRA – Association of European Rugby. The 2013 Series consisted of two tournaments, held in Lyon, France and Bucharest, Romania. England won both legs, winning the overall 2013 Series.

Results

Final standings
Source:

Ukraine was relegated to 2014 European Sevens Championship Division A.

References

External links
FIRA AER web Site
Lyon Grand Prix official web site

2013
International rugby union competitions hosted by Romania
International rugby union competitions hosted by France
European
2013–14 in European rugby union
2013–14 in French rugby union
2013–14 in Romanian rugby union